Lucky the Dinosaur is an approximately  green Segnosaurus free roaming audio animatronics figure which pulls a flower-covered cart and is led by "Chandler the Dinosaur Handler".
Lucky premiered at The Natural History Museum of Los Angeles on August 28, 2003. He made appearances at Disney California Adventure Park as well. Lucky appeared regularly at the DinoLand U.S.A. area of Disney's Animal Kingdom at Walt Disney World from June 2005 to August 2005. He was then moved to Hong Kong Disneyland to celebrate the grand opening of the park in September 2005. As of August 2015, Lucky is at his final home of Walt Disney Imagineering. He is still running as he meets visitors who come with the Backstage Magic Tour from Adventures By Disney.

Lucky is notable in that he was the first free roaming audio-animatronic figure ever created by Disney's Imagineers. The flower cart he pulls conceals the computer and power source. Lucky is capable of moving, vocalizing, and responding to guests.

See also

 Disney's Animal Kingdom attraction and entertainment history
 Hong Kong Disneyland attraction and entertainment history
 Muppet Mobile Lab

References

Walt Disney Parks and Resorts entertainment
Disney California Adventure
Disney's Animal Kingdom
Hong Kong Disneyland
Adventureland (Disney)
Characters of the Disney theme parks
Robotic dinosaurs
Robots of the United States
2005 robots
Animatronic robots
DinoLand U.S.A.